John Binns may refer to:
John Binns (Irish politician) (died 1804), Irish  politician
John Binns (journalist) (1772–1860), Irish  journalist
John Binns (cricketer) (1870–1934), English cricketer
John Binns (British politician) (1914–1986), British politician
Jack R. Binns (born 1933), American diplomat